Manuela Giugliano (born 18 August 1997) is an Italian professional footballer who plays as a midfielder for Roma in Italy's Serie A and the Italy women's national football team.

Club career 
Giugliano played for ACFD Pordenone before joining ASD Torres Calcio in 2014. The following year she signed for ASD Mozzanica. In the summer of 2016, Giugliano agreed to move abroad and play for Primera Iberdrola side Atletico Madrid but then reversed her decision to move to Spain for personal reasons. On 22 September 2016, she returned to her native Italy to sign for AGSM Verona. She then joined ACF Brescia in 2017 before moving to Milan the next season as part of Milan's acquisition of Brescia's Serie A license.

After a single season spent with AC Milan, Giugliano then moved to Roma on 16 July 2019. The move was seen as a coup for Roma, given the Serie A club were signing Giugliano from rivals AC Milan and following Giugliano's performances with Italy at the 2019 World Cup.

During her first season with Roma, and largely owed to her performances with Italy during the 2019 World Cup, Giugliano won Italian football's Female Player of the Year award at the 2019 Gran Galà del Calcio.

Currently, Roma is Giugliano's first and only club in her senior career where she has chosen to stay longer than 12 months, going as far as to sign a three-year contract extension in August 2020. Giugliano then went on to become part of Roma's victorious Coppa Italia 2021 campaign, helping the club to win its first major trophy since A.S. Roma's inception in 2018.

International career 
Giugliano was called up to be part of the Italy U17 for the 2014 FIFA U-17 Women's World Cup, where she played six games and scored three goals. She was called up to be part of the U17 national team for the 2014 UEFA Women's Under-17 Championship. She made her senior debut in a 2–1 win against Ukraine on 25 October 2014. She scored her first international goal in a 6–1 win against Georgia on 18 September 2015, scoring in the 23rd minute.

She was included by manager Antonio Cabrini in Italy's squad for the UEFA Women's Euro 2017. Giugliano was also called up to Milena Bertolini's Italy squad for the 2019 World Cup, after a 20-year absence from the tournament for the Azzurre, where Giugliano's performances in the Italy midfield took plaudits around the world and helped Italy reach the quarter-finals. In an April 2020 interview with Marco Migaleddu, Giugliano claimed her World Cup performance against Brazil in the group stage won her many loyal Brazilian fans who still follow her career today. In 2021, Giugliano was part of Bertolini's Italy team that qualified for the UEFA Euro 2022 tournament.

Style of play 
Manuela Giugliano is a versatile talent who is able to carry out defensive, attacking and transition play to a very high degree of execution. She initially relied on her ball-striking technique and dead-ball technique to mould herself as an attacking midfielder at youth and senior level. However, it was her move to Brescia that sparked a re-think of her career, as Giugliano chose to move back deeper into midfield and rely on her ability to intercept passes in order to influence games. She cites Andrea Pirlo as a role model for this phase of her career.

Giugliano's defensive qualities earned her a key role with Milena Bertolini's Italy, as well as inheriting the number 10 jersey with Roma. She retains the vision to make accurate and early long-range passes to the frontline, from deep midfield, as well as the ability to find key passes into the box when Giugliano moves further up the pitch. Her set-piece ability also makes her a frequent source of assists from corners, for both club and country.

Personal life
Giugliano is lesbian. She grew up in Istrana, in the Treviso area, but all her family are from Naples.

Career statistics

Club

International 

 Scores and results list Italy's goal tally first, score column indicates score after each Giuliano goal.

Honours 
Brescia

 Supercoppa Italiana: 2017

Roma

 Coppa Italia: 2020-21
 Supercoppa Italiana: 2022-23
Italy U17
 FIFA U-17 Women's World Cup Third-place: 2014
 UEFA Women's Under-17 Championship Third-place: 2014

Individual
 AIC Best Women's Player: 2019
 AIC Best Women's XI: 2019, 2020
Pallone Azzurro: 2015

References

External links 

 
 
 
 Profile at LTA Agency

1997 births
Living people
Italian women's footballers
Italy women's international footballers
People from Castelfranco Veneto
Women's association football midfielders
Italian expatriate sportspeople in Spain
Expatriate women's footballers in Spain
People of Campanian descent
Serie A (women's football) players
Torres Calcio Femminile players
A.S.D. AGSM Verona F.C. players
A.C. Milan Women players
A.S. Roma (women) players
2019 FIFA Women's World Cup players
Lesbian sportswomen
LGBT association football players
Italian LGBT sportspeople
Sportspeople from the Province of Treviso
Footballers from Veneto
UEFA Women's Euro 2022 players
UEFA Women's Euro 2017 players
21st-century Italian women